Clifton Mills is an unincorporated community in Preston County, West Virginia, United States. A post office was opened in Clifton Mills in 1881 and operated until being discontinued on November 22, 1963.

The community was named for cliffs near the original town site.

References

Unincorporated communities in Preston County, West Virginia
Unincorporated communities in West Virginia
Morgantown metropolitan area